John Carey, 2nd Earl of Dover (1608 – 26 May 1677), styled Viscount Rochford from 1628 to 1666, was an English peer. He was the eldest son of Henry Carey, 1st Earl of Dover, and Judith, daughter of Sir Thomas Pelham, 1st Baronet. He was educated at St John's College, Cambridge.

Life
In 1640, through a writ of acceleration, he was summoned to the House of Lords as Baron Hunsdon. He succeeded his father as Earl of Dover in 1666. That title became extinct on his death in 1677; he was succeeded as Baron Hunsdon by his distant cousin, Robert.

Marriages and issue
On 9 May 1628, John Carey married Dorothy St. John, daughter of Oliver St John, 1st Earl of Bolingbroke, and Elizabeth Paulet. Dorothy was buried 18 June 1628. There were no children.

He married secondly, on 2 December 1630, Abigail Cokayne, daughter of Sir William Cockayne and Mary Morris. They had two daughters:
 Mary Carey (1631–1696), married William Heveningham, a regicide of Charles I;
 Abigail Carey (born 1633), died young.

References

 

|-

1608 births
1677 deaths
Alumni of St John's College, Cambridge
17th-century English nobility
John
English MPs 1628–1629
Earls of Dover
Barons Hunsdon